Lieutenant General Sir Ralph Abercromby  (7 October 173428 March 1801) was a British soldier and politician. He rose to the rank of lieutenant-general in the British Army, was appointed Governor of Trinidad, served as Commander-in-Chief, Ireland, and was noted for his services during the French Revolutionary Wars, ultimately in the Egyptian campaign. His strategies are ranked amongst the most daring and brilliant exploits of the British army.

Early life

Ralph Abercromby was born on 7 October 1734 at Menstrie Castle, Clackmannanshire. He was the second (but eldest surviving) son of George Abercromby (1705-1800), a lawyer and descendant of the Abercromby family of Birkenbog, Aberdeenshire and Mary Dundas (died 1767), daughter of Ralph Dundas of Manour, Perthshire. His younger brothers include the advocate Alexander Abercromby, Lord Abercromby and General Robert Abercromby.

The family had acquired Menstrie Castle in 1719 but their main family house was the nearby Tullibody House which they had built around 1700. Much of Ralph's childhood was spent in the latter.

Abercromby's education was begun by a private tutor, then continued at the school of Mr Moir in Alloa, then considered one of the best in Scotland despite its Jacobite leanings. Ralph attended Rugby School from 12 June 1748, where he remained until he was 18. Between 1752 and 1753, he was a student at the University of Edinburgh. There he studied moral and natural philosophy and civil law, and was regarded by his professors as sound rather than brilliant. He completed his studies at Leipzig University in Germany from autumn 1754, taking more detailed studies in civil law with a view to a career as an advocate.

Career

On returning from the continent, Abercromby expressed a strong preference for the military profession, and a cornet's commission was accordingly obtained for him (March 1756) in the 3rd Dragoon Guards. He served with his regiment in the Seven Years' War, and thus, the opportunity afforded him of studying the methods of Frederick the Great, which moulded his military character and formed his tactical ideas.

Abercromby rose through the intermediate grades to the rank of lieutenant-colonel of the regiment (1773) and brevet colonel in 1780, and in 1781, he became colonel of the newly raised King's Irish infantry. When that regiment was disbanded in 1783, he retired on half pay. He also entered Parliament as MP for Clackmannanshire (1774–1780). In 1791 he commissioned a large townhouse at 66 Queen Street, Edinburgh.

Abercromby was a strong supporter of the American cause in the American Revolutionary War, and remained in Ireland to avoid having to fight against the colonists. 

When France declared war against Great Britain in 1793, Abercromby resumed his duties. He was appointed command of a brigade under the Duke of York for service in the Netherlands, where he commanded the advanced guard in the action at Le Cateau. During the 1794 withdrawal to Holland, he commanded the allied forces in the action at Boxtel and was wounded directing operations at Fort St Andries on the Waal. In 1795 he commissioned a townhouse at 66 Queen Street, Edinburgh.

In July 1795, Abercromby was nominated by Secretary of State for War Henry Dundas to lead an expedition to the West Indies. Under instructions from Dundas, Abercromby's predecessor, Sir Adam Williamson, the lieutenant-governor of Jamaica, had signed an agreement with representatives of the French colonists of Saint Domingue that promised to restore the ancien regime, slavery and discrimination against mixed-race colonists, a move that drew criticism from abolitionists William Wilberforce and Thomas Clarkson. That same month he had been made a Knight of the Bath and in August Lieutenant Governor of the Isle of Wight – a reward for his services but also possibly an incentive to lead the army in the Caribbean. The appointment of Abercromby as Commander-in-Chief of the Leeward and Windward Islands was officially announced on 5 August.

On 17 March 1796 Abercromby arrived in Carlisle Bay, Barbados on the Arethusa. A third of the 6,000 troops that had arrived on the island before him had already been sent on to Saint Vincent and Grenada, leaving the general with 3,700 soldiers at his disposal. Control of much of Saint Vincent been lost to rebelling French planters and native Caribs since early 1795, while Grenada was in the midst of an insurrection led by Julien Fédon. The reinforcements to Grenada allowed General Nicolls to attack enemy posts south of Port Royal on 25 March, preventing further French reinforcements from Guadeloupe. Three months later Abercromby arrived with further reinforcements and attacked Fédon's camp on 19 June, routing the insurgents and ending the rebellion.

The British fleet sailed on 25 April 1796 for Saint Lucia, landing the following day and establishing a beachhead. The French were soon repelled and retreated to the fort at Morne Fortune, which Abercromby decided to besiege. The garrison under General Goyrand surrendered to the British army 26 May. The island had been retaken at the cost of 566 men. A force of around 4,000 was left to hold Saint Lucia under the command of John Moore before Abercromby left for Saint Vincent at the beginning of June.

Abercromby arrived on Saint Vincent 7 June with a force of just over 4,000. He marched his troops near to the insurgent base at Vigie Ridge and camped nearby as the British started to execute an encircling movement: Quartermaster General John Knox manoeuvred his men on the seaward side in order to prevent the enemy retreating north, and Lieutenant Colonel Dickens used the 34th Regiment as a diversion on the opposite side. Knox was able to cut off communications with the Vigie, whilst Dickens ousted the nearby Caribs to complete the encirclement. The black French commander, Marinier, signed terms of surrender on 11 June and the Caribs did 4 days later. The British took around 200 prisoners, with another 200 escaping into the jungle. Although some of the Caribs would remain in resistance until October, the rebellion had effectively been put down at the cost of 17 officers and 168 men killed or wounded.

Afterwards, Abercromby secured possession of the settlements of Demerara and Essequibo in South America, and the island of Trinidad. A major assault on the port of San Juan, Puerto Rico, in April 1797 failed after fierce fighting where both sides suffered heavy losses.

Abercromby returned to Europe and, in reward for his services, was appointed colonel of the 2nd (Royal North British) Regiment of Dragoons. He was also made Lieutenant-Governor of the Isle of Wight, Governor of Fort George and Fort Augustus in the Scottish Highlands, and promoted to the rank of Lieutenant-general. He again entered Parliament as the member for Clackmannanshire from 1796 to 1798. 

In 1798, Abercromby was made Commander-in-Chief of the forces in Ireland, then in rebellion and anticipating French intervention. He took the unusual step of publicly criticising the command of his predecessor, The 2nd Earl of Carhampton, for bequeathing an army "in a state of licentiousness, which must render it formidable to everyone but the enemy". To quote the biographic entry in the 1888 Encyclopædia Britannica, 

Abercromby was replaced in Ireland by Gerrard Lake who favoured an aggressive approach in putting down the rebellion, as opposed to Abercromby's attempts at conciliation.

After holding for a short period the office of commander-in-chief in Scotland, Abercromby was again called to command under the Duke of York in the 1799 Anglo-Russian expedition against the Napoleonic Dutch Republic. Abercromby conducted a textbook amphibious landing at Callantsoog establishing a beachhead and driving the Franco-Dutch army inland at Krabbendam. The high watermark of British success came when a squadron of the Dutch fleet then surrendered and the Anglo-Russian army advanced through North Holland capturing the cities of Hoorn, Enkhuizen and Medemblik. However, with the Duke of York now in overall command Anglo-Russian fortunes turned sour following the reverse at Castricum. The expected Orangist uprising in the North Holland peninsula never materialized and allies withdrew to their original positions. The expedition ended with the signing of the Convention of Alkmaar in which the Anglo-Russian force was allowed to withdraw.

After spending time with Dundas over Christmas, Abercromby was summoned to London 21 January 1800. The Portuguese, concerned that they were under threat from Spain, requested British support and wanted Abercromby to lead their army. However, Abercromby refused to serve under a foreign ruler and would only take command of a joint army. Before he could leave for Portugal to inspect their defences and army, the resignation of General Charles Stuart in the Mediterranean in April led to a change of plans. The Austrian plan was that Abercromby could create a distraction from the activities of General Michael von Melas in North Italy by landing at various points on the Italian coast. Abercromby received instruction from London to send 2,500–3,000 men to take French-occupied Malta. Thereafter, he was to receive a further 6,000 men to assist the Austrians. General Charles O'Hara in Gibraltar was pleased with the appointment, for while Stuart had been hot-tempered and difficult to work with, Abercromby was "a reasonable, considerate good soldier, and listens with temper and patience to every proposal made to him". However, delays caused by the weather meant that the situation in Italy had changed drastically by the time that Abercromby reached Minorca 22 June.

In 1801, Abercromby was sent with an army to recover Egypt from France. His experience in the Netherlands and the West Indies particularly fitted him for this new command, as was proved when he carried his army in health, in spirits, and with the requisite supplies to the destined scene of action despite great difficulties. The debarkation of the troops at Aboukir, in the face of strenuous opposition, is justly ranked among the most daring and brilliant exploits of the British army.

Battle of Alexandria, 1801 

Abercromby commanded the expedition to the Mediterranean in 1800, and after successfully landing the army at Aboukir and driving the French inland, defeated an attempted French counter-attack at Alexandria, 21 March 1801.

Jacques-François Menou had arrived from Cairo and was determined to defeat the British advance. On the 20th March, the British forces extended across the isthmus, the right wing resting upon the ruins of Nicopolis and the sea, the left on the lake of Abukir. The line faced generally south-west towards the city, the reserve division under Major-General Sir John Moore.

Abercromby anticipated a night attack, so the British slept in position under arms. At 3:30 a.m.  French forces attacked and drove in the British outposts. Moving forward rapidly with great gallantry from the left, Lanusse launched the attack with Valentin's brigade in column along the seashore, and to their right Silly's brigade against the British entrenchments around the roman ruins. The brunt of the attack fell upon Moore's command, and in particular upon the 28th (North Gloucestershire) Regiment of Foot. The British repulsed this first assault, during which both Silly and Lanusse were hit. “General Lanusse saw that General Valentin had left the seashore, and was within the re-entering angle of the redoubt and the Roman camp, where the cross fire of the enemy held him back. General Lanusse marched to this spot, encouraged the men, and made them advance. The worthy general was hit in the thigh by a ball from a gun-boat; four grenadiers tried to carry him off, but a second ball killed two of these brave fellows”.

Soon Rampon's command in the centre was engaged, and despite disorientation in the dark, penetrated between the front and rear wing of the 42nd Regiment of Foot. A confused fight ensued in the ruins, in which the French troops were all either killed or captured with the 42nd taking their colour. Other British regiments engaged were the 23rd Regiment of Foot, 40th (the 2nd Somersetshire) Regiment of Foot and 58th (Rutlandshire) Regiment of Foot, together with Stuart's Minorca Regiment.

The front and rear ranks of the 28th Foot were simultaneously engaged to both their front and rear. During the attack of Roize's second line, Abercromby was briefly captured by French dragoons, but quickly rescued by a highlander of the 42nd. About this time he received a bullet wound to the thigh which would eventually prove fatal, though he remained on the field and in command to the end. Rampon's renewed infantry attack on the centre was repulsed by the Guards brigade, supported by Coote's brigade, and the left wing maintained its position with ease, but the French cavalry for the second time came to close quarters with the reserve.

The 42nd, twice charged by cavalry, had but 13 men wounded by the sabre. Part of the French losses were caused by the gunboats which lay close inshore and cannonaded the left flank of the French columns, and by a heavy naval gun which was placed in battery near the position of 28 March. 

The Battle was won and was a great victory, with Menou forced to retreat to the city of Alexandria. On 17th August, British forces laid siege to Alexandria and later captured the city which effectively ended French control of Egypt and Syria.

Death

During the action of the battle Abercromby was struck by a musket-ball in the thigh; but not until the battle had been won and he saw the enemy retreating did he allow himself to be relieved of command so he could receive medical aid. He was eventually borne from the field in a hammock, cheered by the blessings of the soldiers as he passed, and conveyed on board the flag-ship HMS Foudroyant which was moored in the harbour. The ball could not be extracted; mortification ensued, and seven days later, on 28 March 1801, he died.

Abercromby's old friend and commander, the Duke of York, paid tribute to Abercromby's memory in general orders:

He was buried on St John's Bastion within Fort Saint Elmo in Valletta, Malta. The British military renamed it Abercrombie's Bastion in his honour. The adjacent curtain wall linking this bastion to the fortifications of Valletta, originally called Santa Ubaldesca Curtain, was also renamed Abercrombie's Curtain.

Recognition

By a vote of the House of Commons, a monument was erected in Abercromby's honour in St Paul's Cathedral in London. His widow was created Baroness Abercromby of Tullibody and Aboukir Bay, and a pension of £2,000 a year was settled on her and her two successors in the title.

Abercromby Place in Edinburgh's New Town and Abercromby Square in Liverpool are named in his honour.

Family
On 17 November 1767, Abercromby married Mary Anne, daughter of John Menzies and Ann, daughter of Patrick Campbell. They had seven children. Of four sons, all four entered Parliament, and two saw military service.
Hon. Anne Abercromby (born 21 September 1768 and died October 1832) married Donald Cameron, 22nd Chief of Clan Cameron. They had two sons, and two daughters.
Hon. Mary Abercromby (born 19 August 1773 and died 26 April 1825)
Hon. Catherine Abercromby (born 4 December 1780 and died 1841), married on 31 December 1811 to Thomas Buchanan of Powis (d.1842) Superintendent of Marines at Bombay. They had one son.
George Abercromby, 2nd Baron Abercromby (1770–1843)
General Hon. Sir John Abercromby (1772–1817)
James Abercromby, 1st Baron Dunfermline(1776–1858)
Lt.-Col. Hon. Alexander Abercromby (1784–1853)

Popular culture
Numerous works have been written about Abercromby. A public house in central Manchester, the 'Sir Ralph Abercromby', is named after him. There is also a primary school and pub in Tullibody. There is also another 'General Abercrombie' pub with his portrait by John Hoppner as the sign off of the Blackfriars Bridge Road in London.

Three ships have been named HMS Abercrombie after the general but using the variant spelling of his name.

Further reading
Some public monuments of Valletta 1800–1955

Notes

References

Primary sources

Secondary sources

Divall, Carole. General Sir Ralph Abercromby and the French Revolutionary Wars 1792–1801. (Barnsley: Pen & Sword Military, 2019). 
Howard, Martin R. Death Before Glory: The British Soldier in the West Indies in the French Revolutionary and Napoleonic Wars, 1793–1815. (Barnsley: Pen & Sword Military, 2015).

External links

|-

1734 births
1801 deaths
People from Clackmannanshire
18th-century Scottish people
19th-century Scottish people
People educated at Rugby School
Alumni of the University of Edinburgh
Leipzig University alumni
3rd Dragoon Guards officers
7th Dragoon Guards officers
Ralph
British Army lieutenant generals
British Army personnel of the French Revolutionary Wars
British Army commanders of the Napoleonic Wars
British Army personnel of the Seven Years' War
British military personnel killed in the French Revolutionary Wars
Commanders-in-Chief, Ireland
Governors of British Trinidad
Knights Companion of the Order of the Bath
Lord-Lieutenants of Clackmannanshire
Members of the Parliament of Great Britain for Scottish constituencies
British MPs 1774–1780
British MPs 1796–1800
Scottish military personnel
Politics of Clackmannanshire
Royal Scots Greys officers
Royal Warwickshire Fusiliers officers
Scottish generals
Wars involving Saint Vincent and the Grenadines
Members of the Privy Council of Ireland
Burials in Malta